The diocese of Cervia was a Roman Catholic diocese in Emilia-Romagna.

In 1947 it merged with the archdiocese of Ravenna to form the Archdiocese of Ravenna-Cervia.

Ordinaries

Diocese of Cervia
Erected: 6th Century
Metropolitan: Archdiocese of Ravenna

Guadagno da Majolo, O.F.M. (26 Jun 1342 – )
Bernardo Guascone, O.F.M. (29 Mar 1370 – 1374 Died)
Maynard de Contrariis (2 Apr 1414 – 1431 Resigned)
Cristoforo di San Marcello (2 May 1431 – 21 Nov 1435 Appointed, Bishop of Rimini)
Antonio Correr (cardinal), C.R.S.A.  (Nov 1435 – 1440 Resigned)
Pietro Barbo (1 Jul 1440 – 19 Jun 1451 Resigned)
Isidore of Kiev (10 Jun 1451 – 15 Mar 1455 Resigned)
Francesco Portio (15 Mar 1455 – 1474 Died)
Achille Marescotti (9 Jan 1475 – 20 Nov 1485 Died)
Tommaso Catanei, O.P. (12 Dec 1485 – 1513 Resigned)
Pietro de Flisco  (23 Sep 1513 – 1525 Died)
Paolo Emilio Cesi ( 1525 – 23 Mar 1528 Resigned)
Octavio de Cesi  (23 Mar 1528 – 1534 Died)
Giovanni Andrea Cesi (13 Nov 1534 – 11 Mar 1545 Appointed, Bishop of Todi)
Federico Cesi (11 Mar 1545 – 23 Mar 1545 Resigned)
Scipione Santacroce (23 Mar 1545 – 1576 Resigned)
Ottavio Santacroce (18 Jul 1576 – 1581 Died)
Lorenzo Campeggi (8 Jan 1582 – 6 Nov 1585 Died)
Decio Azzolini (seniore) (15 Nov 1585 – 7 Oct 1587 Died)
Annibal Pauli (12 Oct 1587 – 1590 Died)
Alfonso Visconti, C.O. (8 Feb 1591 – 10 Sep 1601 Appointed, Bishop of Spoleto)
Bonifazio Bevilacqua Aldobrandini (10 Sep 1601 – 7 Apr 1627 Died)
Giovanni Francesco Guidi di Bagno (17 May 1627 – 16 Apr 1635 Appointed, Bishop of Rieti)
Francesco Maria Merlini (17 Sep 1635 – Nov 1644 Died)
Pomponio Spreti (8 Jan 1646 – 15 Nov 1652 Died)
Francesco Gheri (31 May 1655 – 1662 Died)
Anselmo Dandini (26 Jun 1662 – Dec 1664 Died)
Gerolamo Santolini  (15 Jun 1665 – Mar 1667 Died)
Gianfrancesco Riccamonti, O.S.B. (4 Apr 1668 – 17 Apr 1707 Died)
Camillo Spreti  (15 Apr 1709 – Jan 1727 Died)
Gaspare Pizzolanti, O. Carm.  (25 Jun 1727 – 31 Dec 1765 Died)
Giambattista Donati  (2 Jun 1766 – 1792 Died)
Bonaventura Gazzola, O.F.M. Ref.  (1 Jun 1795 – 21 Feb 1820 Appointed, Bishop of Corneto (Tarquinia) e Montefiascone)
Giuseppe Crispino Mazzotti  (21 Feb 1820 – 2 Nov 1825 Died)
Ignazio Giovanni Cadolini  (3 Jul 1826 – 30 Sep 1831 Appointed, Bishop of Foligno)
Mariano Baldassare Medici, O.P. (17 Dec 1832 – 1 Oct 1833 Died)
Innocenzo Castracane degli Antelminelli  (20 Jan 1834 – 12 Feb 1838 Appointed, Bishop of Cesena)
Gaetano Balletti  (12 Feb 1838 – 11 May 1842 Died)
Gioacchino Tamburini (Tamberini)  (22 Jul 1842 – 13 Oct 1859 Died)
Giovanni Monetti  (23 Mar 1860 – 15 Feb 1877 Died)
Federico Foschi  (20 Mar 1877 – 7 Oct 1908 Died)
Pasquale Morganti, O.Ss.C.A. (7 Jan 1909 – 18 Dec 1921 Died)
Antonio Lega  (18 Dec 1921 Succeeded – 16 Nov 1946 Died)

References

External links
 GCatholic.org

Former Roman Catholic dioceses in Italy
Emilia-Romagna